Amritsar South Assembly constituency (Sl. No.: 19) is a Punjab Legislative Assembly constituency in Amritsar district, Punjab state, India.

Members of the Legislative Assembly

Election results

2022 
:

2017
:

Previous Results

References

External links
  

Assembly constituencies of Punjab, India
Amritsar district